The 43rd Primetime Emmy Awards were held on Sunday, August 25, 1991. The ceremony was broadcast on Fox from the Pasadena Civic Auditorium in Pasadena, California. The network TNT received its first major nomination at this ceremony.

For its ninth season, Cheers won Outstanding Comedy Series for the fourth time, tying All in the Familys record. Cheers spinoff Frasier would later break this record, ultimately winning five in a row. Cheers also received the most major nominations (10) and major awards (4) during the ceremony. The drama field also saw a four-time winner crowned as L.A. Law won Outstanding Drama Series for the fourth time in five years. This tied the record set by Hill Street Blues whose four wins came consecutively. James Earl Jones joined an exclusive club, as he won two acting Emmys for his work on two different series.

John Gielgud's win made him the fourth person to become an EGOT.

Winners and nominees

Programs

Acting

Lead performances

Supporting performances

Guest performances

Directing

Writing

Most major nominations
By network 
 NBC – 46
 ABC – 36
 CBS – 31

By program
 Cheers (NBC) – 10
 L.A. Law (NBC) / Murphy Brown (CBS) – 9
 thirtysomething (ABC) – 7

Most major awards
By network 
 ABC – 10
 NBC – 8
 CBS – 5
 HBO / PBS – 2

By program
 Cheers (NBC) – 4
 Gabriel's Fire (ABC) / Murphy Brown (CBS) – 3

Notes

References

External links
 Emmys.com list of 1991 Nominees & Winners
 

043
1991 television awards
1991 in California
August 1991 events in the United States